Marga Spiegel (21 June 1912 – 11 March 2014) was a German writer. She was Jewish and survived the Holocaust of World War II. Her story was published into a book in 1969 and a movie, released in 2009.

Biography
She was born in Oberaula, Hesse, Germany, 21 June 1912.
Before the mass capture and deportation of Jews began, Marga's husband, Siegmund Spiegel, a horse trader in northern Germany and an Iron Cross-awardee during World War I, convinced a friend to shelter his wife and daughter on his farm. Marga and her daughter, Karin, were hidden in plain sight, using assumed names. Siegmund was too well known to use this strategem, and was instead hidden in the attics of near-by farms, able to get a glimpse of his daughter only once during their years in hiding.

Spiegel wrote her most famous book, Saviors in the Night in 1960. Unlike other books about the Holocaust, it told about German citizens who saved Spiegel from the concentration camps. Although Spiegel's book became a best-seller, the story was not made into a film until decades later.

Spiegel died from natural causes on 11 March 2014 in Münster, North Rhine-Westphalia, Germany. She was 101 years old.

References

External links

 

1912 births
2014 deaths
German centenarians
Holocaust survivors
Jewish German writers
People from Schwalm-Eder-Kreis
German women writers
Jewish women writers
Women centenarians
Horse trader